Tephrocactus (from Greek tephra, "ash", referring to the color of these plants' epidermis) is a genus of the cactus family (Cactaceae).

Species
Species of the genus Tephrocactus according to Plants of the World Online :

References

Bibliography 
 G. G. Leyton-Boyce et J. Illiff : ''The subgenus Tephrocactus (of the genus Opuntia), Morden, 1973

External links 
  photos on www.cactiguide.com

 
Opuntioideae genera